Guntur Municipal Corporation is the civic body that governs the Guntur City in the Indian state of Andhra Pradesh. It is one of the oldest municipalities and the third largest municipal corporation in the state.

History

Guntur municipality was constituted in the year 1866 and the first elected body was formed in 1881. The municipality was upgraded to II-Grade in 1891, I-Grade in 1917, Special Grade in 1952 and then to Selection Grade in 1960. In 1994, the Municipal Corporation was formed.

Governance

Jurisdiction

The city limits were expanded by merging the ten surrounding villages into the corporation. There exists 57 political divisions post merger of villages into the corporation.

Functions 

Guntur Municipal Corporation is created for the following functions:

 Planning for the town including its surroundings which are covered under its Department's Urban Planning Authority .

 Approving construction of new buildings and authorising use of land for various purposes.

 Improvement of the town's economic and Social status.

 Arrangements of water supply towards commercial,residential and industrial purposes.

 Planning for fire contingencies through Fire Service Departments.

 Creation of solid waste management,public health system and sanitary services.

 Working for the development of ecological aspect like development of Urban Forestry and making guidelines for environmental protection.

 Working for the development of weaker sections of the society like mentally and physically handicapped,old age and gender biased people.

 Making efforts for improvement of slums and poverty removal in the town.

Revenue sources 

The following are the Income sources for the Corporation from the Central and State Government.

Revenue from taxes 

Following is the Tax related revenue for the corporation.

 Property tax.

 Profession tax.

 Entertainment tax.

 Grants from Central and State Government like Goods and Services Tax.

 Advertisement tax.

Revenue from non-tax sources 

Following is the Non Tax related revenue for the corporation.

 Water usage charges.

 Fees from Documentation services.

 Rent received from municipal property.

 Funds from municipal bonds.

Governing body

The Standing Committee of the corporation consists of two wings namely, executive and governing bodies. The present Municipal commissioner Keerthi Chekuri.

The below table depicts the structure of the corporation:

2021 Ordinary Elections

Civic services

The corporation works on improving civic needs like roads, bus shelters, pavements, public gardens etc.

Projects
A 15 MW waste-to-energy plant is set up with the collaboration of the JITF Urban Infrastructure Limited.

Awards and achievements
In 2015, as per the Swachh Bharat Abhiyan of the Ministry of Urban Development, Guntur Municipal Corporation was ranked 70th in the country.

See also
List of municipal corporations in Andhra Pradesh

References 

Municipal corporations in Andhra Pradesh
1944 establishments in India
Government of Guntur